Kuntilanak 3 (English: The Chanting 3) is an Indonesian horror film directed by Rizal Mantovani. The film is the third in a trilogy, preceded by Kuntilanak and Kuntilanak 2. The film stars Julie Estelle, Imelda Therinne and Laudya Cynthia Bella. The film was released on March 13, 2008.

Plot 
A newly engaged couple, Stella and her fiancée Rimson, disappears on a trekking trip in a virgin forest. This event prompts four SAR Komodo Team members, Darwin, Asti, Herman, and Petra, to search for them. The SAR Komodo Team conducts the search mission through the land course, where they come across Samantha and convince her to join. They finally reach the forest's entrance, only to find the passage blocked, inducing them to continue their journey by climbing the hilly road into the deep woods.

After settling down to camp, the SAR Komodo crews urge Samantha to tell them why she entered the forest. Samantha retorts that they should abandon their search and rescue mission. Moments later, they suddenly hear strange noises and experience supernatural phenomena which influence them to venture further. During this excursion, Samantha finds Stella's red shawl. Samantha recalls the previous encounter with her mother, Mega N. Widjoko. She asked Samantha to go to Ujung Sedo, located at the deep forest's fringe, to eliminate her wangsit over the Kuntilanak.

The next morning, a thick mist appears out of nowhere, causing disturbance to their equipment. Braving through the fog, Samantha and the others later follow Yenny, the daughter of Sam's landlord, who the Kuntilanak kidnapped in the second film. They trail her until she disappears at a cave opening. Going without direction into the cave, they split into two groups. They face terrorizing events and unexplainable encounters. In the climax, they manage to exit the cave with a warning: Samantha must go to the house of Mbah Putri, the origin of the Kuntilanak's wangsit in the Mangkoedjiwo family.

As they set up to camp at the clearing, Samantha explains her reason for coming here and ominously proclaims they have arrived at "Ujung Sedo". While everyone sleeps, the Kuntilanak haunts Herman, causing him to fall into quicksand. The remaining four then search for Herman in the morning and stumble upon a 'ghost' village. The group finds a cow carcass along with a crying baby. Although warned by others not to take the strange baby, Petra takes the child. During the night, the baby goes missing, and when Petra goes out to search for the child, the Kuntilanak attacks her. Afterward, Asti, Darwin, and Samantha venture out to look for Petra. Samantha comes across Yenny, follows her to a field with fallen leaves, and sees a group of blind children running after a white horse.

Chasing after them, Samantha manages to find Yenny and, while hiding, witnesses the Kuntilanak's deed of collecting children to suck off their souls as sustenance. As Yenny and Samantha flee, Darwin, who saw the Kuntilanak, commits suicide after the latter enchants him. En route to Mbah Putri's house, Samantha meets Asti, who promises to survive together. Henceforth, Yenny and Samantha arrive at Mbah Putri's dwelling. Confronting Samantha, Mbah Putri reveals the origin story of the Kuntilanak who came from the place. The Kuntilanak was the vengeful spirit of a mother killed after giving birth to the devil's child, whose fate was similar to the former. The now 100-year-old Mbah Putri agreed to carry the child in her womb as part of the pact to attain immortality.

Mbah Putri composed the Durmo (or the Chant), sung by Samantha and all the Mangkoedjiwo descendants, to summon the Kuntilanak. The Kuntilanak replenished the strength of the devil's spawn, using murdered victims' souls to enable it to stay alive in Mbah Putri's womb. Samantha cannot eliminate the wangsit as long as the child still lives. Sam's encounter with Mega was an illusion created by Mbah Putri to lure Samantha to Ujung Sedo and become the replacement host. Afterward, Mbah Putri sings the 'Durmo' and releases the devil's child, who crawls into Sam's womb. Later on, Samantha tells Yenny to go to the rescue point, and she climbs atop the waterfall and jumps off so the child will die with her.

Asti, Yenny, and her fellow captives head to the rescue point, and the rescuing helicopter descends, saving all of them. Meanwhile, a hand (possibly Samantha's) appears under the waterfall's stones.

Cast

External links 
 Situs web resmi  
 
 Ruang Film  

2008 films
2008 horror films
2000s Indonesian-language films
Indonesian horror films
Films set in Indonesia
Indonesian ghost films
Films shot in Indonesia
Indonesian sequel films